Phu Dong Football Club, simply known as Phu Dong, is a Vietnamese football club which is based in Hanoi, Vietnam.

Before the 2017 season, Phu Dong had recruited former national team defender Vũ Như Thành as captain, and persuaded midfielder Cao Sỹ Cường to continue playing. At the same time, the team also announced information about the new major sponsor, Mitsubishi Motors Vietnam, with a large amount of funding.

Honours

National competitions
League
Third League
 Winners :  2016

Season-by-season record

Current squads 
As of 18 August 2022

Kit suppliers and shirt sponsors

Managers
  Lê Đức Tuấn (2015–now)

References

External links
Phù Đổng official site

Football clubs in Vietnam